Xie Zhenhua may refer to:

 Xie Zhenhua (general) (谢振华; 1916–2011), Chinese general
 Xie Zhenhua (politician) (解振华; born 1949), Chinese politician